Central Park is an unincorporated community in Alberta, Canada within Red Deer County that is recognized as a designated place by Statistics Canada.

Demographics 

As a designated place in the 2011 Census, Central Park had a population of 79 living in 28 of its 28 total dwellings, a -7.1% change from its 2006 population of 85.

See also 
List of communities in Alberta

References 

Former designated places in Alberta
Localities in Red Deer County